The Ducal Castle, also known as the Pomeranian Dukes' Castle, and Szczecin Castle, is a renaissance castle in the city of Szczecin, Poland, located at the Castle Hill in the Stare Miasto (Old Town) neighbourhood, near the Oder river. It is built in the gothic and Pomeranian mannerism architectural style. The castle was the seat of the dukes of Pomerania-Stettin of the House of Pomerania, who ruled the Duchy of Pomerania from 1121 to 1637. The building history originates in 1346, when duke Barnim III began the construction of the ducal housing complex, and continues to 1428, when, under the rule of Casimir V, it was expanded, forming the castle. Currently, it is one of the largest cultural centres in the West Pomeranian Voivodeship, Poland.

History
Barnim the Great of Pomerania-Stettin erected the castle within Szczecin's walls against the will of the burghers in 1346. An older Pomeranian burgh had been leveled in 1249. In 1490 the castle was partially reconstructed for Bogusław X's wedding with Anna Jagiellonka (daughter of king Casimir IV Jagiellon).

Between 1573 and 1582 the castle was rebuilt again, this time in the mannerist style for duke John Frederick by Italian stonemasons according to design by Wilhelm Zachariasz Italus. Two new wings were added to close the courtyard before the medieval southern and eastern wings. The main gate was adorned with ducal crest, the eastern wing was enhanced and the northern wing was intended for chapel.

In 1648, due to the tenets of the Peace of Westphalia, the castle become a seat of Swedish governor. Before 1705 another reconstruction occurred to prepare the castle for Queen of Poland - Catherine Opalińska, who lived here with her daughters Anna and Marie Leszczyńska (future Queen of France) and a small court between 1705 and 1711. In 1711 king Stanisław I Leszczyński, who sought refuge before chasing him Saxon and Russian forces, joined his wife and daughters at the castle.  
 
After the Great Northern War, in 1720, the city of Stettin become a Prussian property and the castle was allocated to the garrison commander Christian August, Prince of Anhalt-Zerbst, whose daughter Sophie Friederike Auguste (future Catherine II of Russia) was born here in 1729 and was raised in the castle.

Under Swedish and later Prussian rule, the castle was extensively modified. In 1840-1842 a tower in Classical architecture in allusion to the architecture of Karl Friedrich Schinkel was erected, and the south wing was built in the style of Frederician Rococo.

Polish conservations maintain that these modifications under Prussian rule in the 19th were barbaric, devastating the many Renaissance elements in the castle  (arcades, attics, vaulting). Eventually about 60% of the castle was destroyed during World War II (August 1944).

Under Polish rule, the castle was rebuilt between 1958 and 1980 with some modifications. The castle was seen as a point of contact with the town's lost Slavic past, supporting and legitimizing the cleansing of Germans and subsequent Polonization. The castle was restored to its original 16th-century appearance according to 1653 engraving by Matthäus Merian (among others). The refernence to the Renaissane appearance was important because during Renaissance times, the town, part of the Holy Roman Empire was ruled by  the House of Griffin, whose Slavic or even Piast descence is debated among historians. The castle thus became a lieu de mémoire for the town's new inhabitants.

Gallery

See also 
 List of mannerist structures in Northern Poland
 Castles in Poland

Notes

References

External links

 Official website 
 Spherical panoramas of the Castle
 The Association of Castles and Museums around the Baltic Sea

Castles in West Pomeranian Voivodeship
History of Pomerania
Duchy of Pomerania
Buildings and structures in Szczecin
Museums in West Pomeranian Voivodeship
Culture in Szczecin
Burial sites of the House of Pomerania
Renaissance architecture in Poland
Old Town, Szczecin
Buildings and structures completed in 1346
Buildings and structures completed in 1428